Kakao Webtoon (Hangul: 카카오 웹툰) is a webtoon platform operated by Kakao.

History
The service originally launched in 2003 by Daum, a popular web portal in Korea, as Daum Webtoon making it the first official webtoon platform in the world. It would operate under Daum up until the company merged with Kakao in 2014. The service operated as Daum Webtoon alongside Kakao's other service, KakaoPage, attracting many readers to its platform. It wasn't until August 1, 2021, when the service was relaunched as Kakao Webtoon in order to expand globally and management changed to the platform now being operated by Kakao Entertainment, a subsidiary of Kakao. The service also expanded to Thailand and Taiwan that same year. In April 2022, an Indonesian language service was launched to replace the Indonesian Kakao Page service.

Adaptations of Daum/Kakao webtoons

See also 
 KakaoPage
 Piccoma

References

External links
Kakao Webtoon
Kakao Webtoon Thailand
Kakao Webtoon Taiwan

Webtoon publishing companies
Webcomic publishing companies
Kakao
Internet properties established in 2003
2003 establishments in South Korea